Philip Henri Gilbert (October 25, 1870 – October 18, 1932) was a lawyer and Democratic politician from Napoleonville in Assumption Parish in South Louisiana.

Gilbert was the district attorney of the Louisiana 27th Judicial District from 1908 to 1916 and judge of the same district from 1916 to 1920. As the President of the Louisiana State Senate from 1924 to 1926, Gilbert succeeded to the lieutenant governorship on an interim basis until the expiration of the regular term in 1928.

Early years
Gilbert was instrumental in the construction of St. Anne's Catholic Church in Napoleonville, he was a church trustee and a founding member of his local chapter of the Catholic men's organization, the Knights of Columbus.

Until he was sixteen years old, Gilbert attended the public and private schools of Assumption Parish. In 1905, he began his studies at the Tulane University Law School in New Orleans, from which he obtained a Bachelor of Laws degree.

On January 24, 1894, Gilbert married Ella Marie Savoie. The couple had eight children.

Political offices

Gilbert ran unsuccessfully for lieutenant governor in 1920 against Hewitt Bouanchaud, who was elected along with John M. Parker as governor.

From 1924 to 1930, he was the state senator for Assumption, Lafourche, and Terrebonne parishes in what was then the 12th District. He was the Senate President from 1926 to 1928 and the Senate President Pro Tempore from 1928 to 1930. Gilbert was also the  assistant clerk for the 1908 Louisiana Constitutional Convention and a member of the 1921 Louisiana Constitutional Convention. After the death of Governor Henry L. Fuqua in 1926, Lieutenant Governor Oramel H. Simpson succeeded to the governor's office, and Gilbert as president of the state senate became the interim lieutenant governor until his abbreviated term expired in 1928.

On May 16, 1929, as the Senate President Pro Tempore, Gilbert, a loyal supporter of the new governor, Huey Pierce Long, Jr., was the first to sign the round robin to announce that the two-thirds state Senate majority could not be obtained for Long's conviction of the impeachment voted by the Louisiana House of Representatives. Long called his friend "a splendid scholar and parliamentarian. ... The intense hate of my enemies toward me has been a matter of frequent comment. It is more than offset, however, by the loyalty of friends."

In 1928, Gilbert became judge of the Louisiana 23rd Judicial District, a post that he held until his death.

Gilbert was also a delegate to the 1916 Democratic National Convention, which re-nominated U.S. President Woodrow Wilson and Vice President Thomas R. Marshall.

Business

Gilbert was the president of the Lula Company, Inc., which operates the Lula Plantation in Assumption Parish.  This firm operated its own sugar refinery. He was president of the Avon Planting Company, Ltd., which operated the Avon Plantation, near Napoleonville.

He served as president of the Bank of Assumption which opened its doors for business in Napoleonville in 1901.

References

1870 births
1932 deaths
Tulane University Law School alumni
Lieutenant Governors of Louisiana
Democratic Party Louisiana state senators
Louisiana state court judges
District attorneys in Louisiana
Businesspeople from Louisiana
People from Napoleonville, Louisiana
Cajun people
Huey Long
Catholics from Louisiana